Gavin McCoy  is an English radio broadcaster born and educated in Oxford, England, who has worked on  Steve Wright's show and as programme controller for Smooth Radio.

He and his wife run a marketing training company.

References

External links
LinkedIn page 

Living people
British radio personalities
British radio journalists
Year of birth missing (living people)